"Take Me As I Am" is the third single released by Canadian band FM Static, from their third album, Dear Diary. It is the first song to chart for the band. The song was originally released for listening before the release of the album, along with "Boy Moves to a New Town With Optimistic Outlook" and "The Unavoidable Battle of Feeling on the Outside".

Charts

References

2009 singles
FM Static songs
2009 songs
Tooth & Nail Records singles